The 1934 Resettlement Law (also known as Law no. 2510) was a policy adopted on 14 June 1934 by the Turkish government which set forth the basic principles of immigration. Joost Jongerden has written that the law constituted a policy of forcible assimilation of non-Turkish minorities through forced and collective resettlement.

Background

There were resettlement policies also at the end of the Ottoman Empire. From 1910 onwards the Ottoman Empire began to establish immigrant commissions that regulated the settlement of the immigrants coming from the Balkans. The immigrants from the Balkans were not allowed to exceed 10% of the local population. Kurds who were resettled from Eastern Anatolia to the west, were also split up in groups not exceeding 300 people and tribe leaders were separated from their tribe. The Kurds should also not make up more than 5% of the local population they were resettled to. A previous settlement law from May 1926 (also known as Law no. 885) regulated abolition of small villages and resettlement of their population to central locations, and a decree from March 1933 also demanded resettlement of the population in mountain areas to central locations.

The Resettlement Law of 1934 
The Resettlement Law of 1934 was passed by the Turkish National Assembly on 14 June 1934. The law was made public and put into effect after it was published in the Resmi Gazete a week after its promulgation. According to the Interior Minister Şükrü Kaya:

Taking into consideration security and political concerns, the law closed strategic regions of the country to non-Muslim minority settlement. Turkish politicians understood that many non-Turks had been resettled on their own into separate villages and therefore had not assimilated into Turkishness. Those individuals who "spoke alien dialects" had been able to differentiate themselves from the Turkish nation. It was a necessity to assess those villages in which such "alien dialects" were spoken and to distribute populations which spoke the "alien dialects" to nearby Turkish villages in order to foster and encourage forced assimilation.

Under Article I of the law, the Minister of Interior was granted the right to govern and redistribute the interior population of the country in accordance with an individual's adherence to Turkish culture. Article 11 was a provision regarding that the resettlement must assure 

The settlement zones were divided in three separate zones according to the adherence of Turkish culture in the each particular individual:
Zone 1 - Areas deemed desirable to increase the density of the culturally Turkish population.
Zone 2 - Areas deemed desirable to establish populations that had to be assimilated into Turkish culture.
Zone 3 - Areas which had been decided should be evacuated for military, economic, political, or public health reasons, and where resettlement was prohibited.

In paragraph Four of Article 10, the Ministry of Interior was granted the authority to transfer any individual who did not possess a certain degree of "Turkish culture" to Zone 2, where forced assimilatory practices would take place.

According to Article 12, those individuals who did not speak Turkish and were in Zone 1 and were not transferred Zone 2 must be settled in villages, towns, and districts that had a preexisting dominance of Turkish culture in order to foster assimilation. Kurds who have been resettled shall not have been allowed to constitute more than 5% of the population in the locations they have been resettled to.  More than half a million Kurds have been resettled with this law from the third zone to the second zone.   

The law also required the resettlement of Muslim minorities such as Circassians, Albanians, and Abkhazes who were considered Muslims who had failed to fully adhere to the Turkish nation. Although these minorities shared the same faith as their Turkish counterparts, it was still considered the goal, by the politicians of the Turkish Republic, to bind all peoples of Turkey to become Turkish. Due to the logistical difficulties of resettling all non-Turkish populations into areas with a Turkish majority, the Law was mainly implemented in times of Kurdish uprisings.

Thracian events

Although the Law on Settlement was expected to operate as an instrument for Turkifying the mass of non-Turkish speaking citizens, it immediately emerged as a piece of legislation which sparked riots against non-Muslims, as evidenced in the 1934 Thrace pogroms in the immediate aftermath of the law's passage. Law No. 2510 was issued on 14 June 1934, and the Thrace pogroms began just over a fortnight later, on 3 July. The incidents seeking to force out the region's non-Muslim residents first began in Çanakkale, where Jews received unsigned letters telling them to leave the city, and then escalated into an antisemitic campaign involving economic boycotts and verbal assaults as well as physical violence against the Jews living in the various provinces of Thrace. It is estimated that out of a total 15,000-20,000 Jews living in the region, more than half fled to Istanbul during and after the incidents. However, although the Law on Settlement may well have actually provoked the incidents’ outbreak, the national authorities did not side with the attackers but immediately intervened in the incidents. After order was restored, the governors and mayors of the provinces involved were removed from office.

Dersim Rebellion

The law played a major role in the events leading to the Dersim rebellion in 1937. Forced resettlement was used in the depopulation of Dersim in Eastern Turkey in 1937-1938, where, according to McDowall, 40,000 people were killed. According to official Turkish reports, in seventeen days of the 1938 offensive alone, 7,954 persons were reported killed or caught alive. As the number of people who were caught alive was a minority, it can be concluded that almost 10 percent of the entire population of Tunceli was killed. The Kurds claim that their losses were even higher.

The 1934 Turkish Resettlement Law was the legal justification used for the forced resettlement. It was used primarily to target the region of Dersim as one of its first test cases, which left disastrous consequences for the local population. 

In a report delivered to the Republican People's Party (CHP) after the Dersim Rebellion, the law was described as an effective vehicle for the Turkification of the eastern provinces and the destruction of a united Kurdish territory. It was also demanded that further resettlements should take place in order to ensure that the Turkish population will raise to 50% in the eastern provinces.

See also
Deportations of Kurds
Citizen, speak Turkish!
Racism in Turkey
Varlık Vergisi

References

External links
Turkish Government Sources
 Resmi Gazete No. 2733

Discrimination in Turkey
Turkish nationalism
1930s in Turkey
Linguistic discrimination
1934 in Turkey
Turkish settlements
Forced migration
Economic history of Turkey
1934 in law
Language policy in Turkey